Hoerr is a German surname. Notable people with the surname include:

Irv Hoerr (born 1946), American racing driver
John Hoerr (1930–2015), American journalist and historian

See also
Horr (disambiguation)

References

German-language surnames